Tan Sri Dato' Haji Hassan Yunos Stadium, also known as Larkin Stadium, is a multi-purpose stadium in Larkin, Johor Bahru, Johor, Malaysia. It is currently used mostly for football matches. The stadium holds 30,000 people and opened in 1964. It is named after former Menteri Besar of Johor, Tan Sri Hassan Yunus.

History
The stadium was built in 1964, but back then it was only a minor venue with 15,000 people to accommodate. In 1991, the capacity was doubled after a minor revamp. Athletics track, floodlight masts and media infrastructure also came in allowing the ground to host major events. One of the major events came in 1997 when the 1997 FIFA World Youth Championship was played at the venue. Seats were installed as part of the event preparation.

Events 
 1992 Sukma Games
 1997 FIFA World Youth Championship

References 

Football venues in Malaysia
Buildings and structures in Johor Bahru
Rugby union stadiums in Malaysia
Athletics (track and field) venues in Malaysia
Multi-purpose stadiums in Malaysia
Sports venues in Johor
Sports venues completed in 1964